Napir (Linear Elamite:  Elamite cuneiform: 𒈾𒀊𒅕 Na-pi-ir) was the Elamite god of the moon. The name was likely derived from the Elamite word nap or napir meaning "god".

References

Further reading
Heidemarie Koch, "Theology and Worship in Elam and Achaemenid Iran"

Elamite gods
Lunar gods